Matthew Tomkins (born June 19, 1994) is a Canadian professional ice hockey goaltender. He is currently playing for Färjestad BK in the Swedish Hockey League (SHL). Tomkins was born in Edmonton, Alberta, Canada.

Playing career

International Play 

After the NHL decided not to send players to the 2022 Olympics in Beijing, Tomkins was selected to Team Canada as one of three goalies. Tomkins was backup for the first two games of the preliminary round, a win over Germany and a loss to the United States. In the third game, he made his first start for Canada and got a shutout against China in a 5–0 win. Tomkins would follow by backstopping Canada to a 7–2 qualification round win over China again, before bowing out to Sweden in a 2–0 quarterfinal loss.

After his showing at the 2022 Olympics, Tomkins was once again called upon to Team Canada at the 2022 IIHF World Championships. He did not play until the gold medal game, where an injury early in the third period to starter Chris Dreidger forced Tomkins into the game, where Canada would eventually fall in overtime.

Career statistics

Regular season and playoffs

International

References

External links
 

1994 births
Living people
Canadian expatriate ice hockey players in Sweden
Canadian ice hockey goaltenders
Chicago Blackhawks draft picks
Färjestad BK players
Frölunda HC players
Indy Fuel players
Rockford IceHogs (AHL) players
Ice hockey people from Edmonton
Ice hockey players at the 2022 Winter Olympics
Olympic ice hockey players of Canada